The 2011 Liga Indonesia Premier Division Final was a football match which was played on Wednesday, 25 May 2011.

Road to Final

Match details

See also
2010–11 Liga Indonesia Premier Division

References

External links
Liga Indonesia Premier Division standings

2009-10